Acrocercops niphocremna is a moth of the family Gracillariidae, known from Maharashtra, India. It was described by Edward Meyrick in 1932. The hostplant for the species is Terminalia chebula.

References

niphocremna
Moths of Asia
Moths described in 1932